Diffa is a department of the Diffa Region in Niger. It is bordered by Chad to the east. Its capital lies at the city of Diffa. As of 2011, the department had a total population of 209,249 people.

References

Departments of Niger
Diffa Region